The Karit fruit or कारटे Kaarate (Cucumis melo var. agrestis) is a variety of muskmelon found in India. Similar to a cucumber, the Karit has a bitter taste. The fruit plays a part in the Diwali traditions of Goa and Maharashtra. This fruit is stamped by the heel of the left foot on the second day of Diwali by everyone after all come out of baths. Its significance is when Lord Krishna kills the demon Narakasura by stamping his  heel of left foot and destroys him.

References

Cucurbitoideae
Melons